The North Carolina General Assembly 2021–2022 session was the state legislature that first convened in January 2021 and will conclude in December 2022. Members of the North Carolina Senate and the North Carolina House of Representatives were elected in November 2020.

House of Representatives
The House of Representatives leadership and members are listed below.

House Leadership

House Members

The following table shows the district, party, counties represented, and date first elected of members of the House of Representatives.

↑: Member was first appointed to office.

Senate
The North Carolina Senate leadership and members are listed below.

Senate leadership

Members of the Senate
The district, party, home residence, counties represented, and date first elected is listed below for the members of the Senate:

↑: Member was originally appointed to fill the remainder of an unexpired term.

Notes

References

External links

2021
General Assembly
General Assembly
 2021
 2021
2021 U.S. legislative sessions